Arent Nicolai Dragsted (9 June 182115 August 1898) was a Danish goldsmith based in Copenhagen who was granted the predicate Purveyor to the Court of Denmark shortly before his death. His company, A. Dragsted, still exists today. Dragsted created the golden horn that was presented to Bernhard Severin Ingemann by Danish women on the occasion of his 75 years birthday.  The horn is now on display in the Danish Museum of National History at Frederiksborg Castle in Hillerød.  He has also created the golden wreath for Frederick VIIøs sarcofague in Roskilde Cathedral.

Early life and education
Dragsted was born in 1821 in Kerteminde on Funen, the son of Mathias Nicolai Dragsted (1790-1873) and Frandsine Dragsted née Roed (1697-1867). He apprenticed as a goldsmith in his home town and later enrolled at the School of Drawing of the Royal Danish Academy of Fine Arts in Copenhagen where he studied under Herman Wilhelm Bissen and Gustav Friedrich Hetsch.

Career
Dragsted established his own workshop in Bredgade in 1854. He wa highly respected for his work, especially as a chaser. He ended his career as alderman of the Goldsmiths' Guild in Copenhagen. He was granted the predicate Purveyor to the Court of Denmark shortly before his death.

Works
 
Dragsted created the golden horn that was presented to Bernhard Severin Ingemann by Danish women on the occasion of his 75th birthday. He has also created the golden wreath for Frederick VII's sarcophagus in Roskilde Cathedral.

Personal life
Dragsted married Ane Marie Bech (1825-1861). She bore him two sons, Frantz M. N. Dragsted (1853-1916) and Alfred Dragsted. Arent Nicolai Dragsted died in 1891. He is buried in Gentofte Cemetery in Gentofte.

See also
 Jørgen Balthasar Dalhoff

References

External links

 A. Dragsted
 A. Dragsted
  Arent Nicolai Dragsted at geni.com
 Vintage photo from the store
 Image
 Source
 Spurce

1821 births
1898 deaths
Danish goldsmiths
19th-century Danish metalsmiths
Artisans from Copenhagen
People from Kerteminde
Danish companies established in 1854